There are at least 9 named lakes and reservoirs in Newton County, Arkansas.

Lakes
According to the United States Geological Survey, there are no named lakes in Newton County, Arkansas.

Reservoirs
	Edwards Lake, el.  
	Fowler Lake, el.  
	Hurricane Lake, el.  
	Lower Hurricane Lake, el.  
	Mill Creek Hollow Reservoir, el.  
	North Pond, el.  
	South Pond, el.  
	Sycamore Lake, el.  
	Weatherby Lake, el.

See also
 List of lakes in Arkansas

Notes

Bodies of water of Newton County, Arkansas
Newton